Robert Milne (August 19, 1881 – July 1, 1953) was a farmer who sat in House of Commons of Canada during the 1920s as a Progressive Party MP.

Milne attended Manitoba Agricultural College before becoming a farmer in Mekiwin. He was first elected to Parliament in the 1921 federal election from Neepawa, was defeated in the 1925 election but regained his set in 1926 before being defeated for the final time in the 1930 federal election.

References

1881 births
1953 deaths
Members of the House of Commons of Canada from Manitoba
Progressive Party of Canada MPs